Yrjö Ilmari Lehtilä (19 November 1916 in Turku – 27 March 2000) was a Finnish shot putter who competed in the 1948 Summer Olympics.

References

1916 births
2000 deaths
Finnish male shot putters
Olympic athletes of Finland
Athletes (track and field) at the 1948 Summer Olympics
Sportspeople from Turku
European Athletics Championships medalists
20th-century Finnish people